The Unfaithfuls is a 1953 Italian comedy drama film directed by Mario Monicelli and Steno and starring Gina Lollobrigida.

Plot

Cast
 Gina Lollobrigida as Lulla Possenti
 May Britt as Liliana Rogers
 Pierre Cressoy as Osvaldo Dal Prà
 Tina Lattanzi as Carla Bellaris
 Carlo Romano as Giovanni Azzali
 Irene Papas as Luisa Azzali
 Charles Fawcett as Henry Rogers (as Charles Fawcet)
 Paolo Ferrara as Il commissario
 Giulio Calì as Cantagalli - il proprietario dell'agenzia Lince
 Margherita Bagni as La madre di Marisa
 Tania Weber as L'amica di Lulla
 Carlo Lamas as Carlo, l'autista - amante di Luisa
 Marina Vlady as Marisa (as Marina Wladi)
 Anna Maria Ferrero as Cesarina 
 Carlo Mazzarella as The Photographer

References

External links

 

1953 films
1953 comedy-drama films
1950s Italian-language films
Italian black-and-white films
Films directed by Mario Monicelli
Films directed by Stefano Vanzina
Films produced by Carlo Ponti
Films produced by Dino De Laurentiis
Italian comedy-drama films
1950s Italian films